José Perales Nájera (born 25 May 1993) is a Spanish footballer who plays for San Fernando CD as a goalkeeper.

Club career
Born in Palma de Mallorca, Balearic Islands, Perales was an Atlético Madrid youth graduate. On 19 July 2010, he joined CD Puertollano; initially assigned to the reserves in the regional leagues, he made his first-team debut on 6 March 2011 by coming on as a second-half substitute in a 3–1 Segunda División B away loss against Lucena CF.

In 2012, after spending the vast majority of his spell with the B side, Perales signed for another reserve team, Elche CF Ilicitano of Tercera División. He continued to compete in the third and fourth tiers in the following years, representing CE Constància, CD Atlético Baleares and CD Binissalem.

On 16 July 2016, Perales moved to Gimnàstic de Tarragona's farm team CF Pobla de Mafumet, being also the third choice of the main squad behind Manolo Reina and Stole Dimitrievski. After Reina's departure he was definitely promoted to the first team, and renewed his contract until 2020 on 7 August 2017.

Perales made his professional debut on 2 September 2017, starting in a 0–4 home loss against Sporting de Gijón in the Segunda División. The following 13 June, after spending the season playing understudy to both Dimitrievski and Bernabé Barragán, he terminated his contract.

On 20 July 2018, Perales signed with third division club CF Badalona. The following 19 January, he moved abroad and agreed to a one-year deal at FC Dinamo Tbilisi.

References

External links

1993 births
Living people
Spanish footballers
Footballers from Palma de Mallorca
Association football goalkeepers
Segunda División players
Segunda División B players
Tercera División players
Primera Federación players
CD Puertollano footballers
Elche CF Ilicitano footballers
CE Constància players
CD Atlético Baleares footballers
CD Binissalem players
CF Pobla de Mafumet footballers
Gimnàstic de Tarragona footballers
CF Badalona players
San Fernando CD players
Erovnuli Liga players
FC Dinamo Tbilisi players
Spanish expatriate footballers
Expatriate footballers in Georgia (country)
Spanish expatriate sportspeople in Georgia (country)